Tour of Azerbaijan (Iran), also known as the Tour of Iranian Azerbaijan or Azerbaijan Tour is an annual multiple stage road bicycle racing held in Iran since 1986, named after Iranian Azerbaijan. It is a UCI 2.1 category race and is part of the UCI Asia Tour. Tour of Iran (Azerbaijan) is the most prestigious cycling tour in Iran and it is the oldest standing cycling tour in Asia.

The tour routes commences from Tabriz the largest city in Iranian Azerbaijan and it passes through Lake Urmia, Urmia, Jolfa, Meshginshahr, Sareyn and Kaleybar, and then it finishes at Tabriz.

History
Tour of Azerbaijan (Iran) established on 1986 by Asghar Khodayari and Akbar Goharkhani with the name of Tour de Urmia Lake. The stages of the tour were modified several times. In 2010 one stage of the tour was held in Nakhichevan, an autonomous republic of Azerbaijan. In 2013 Azerbaijan International Cycling Tour was renamed to Tour of Azerbaijan (Iran).

In 2016 for the first time a cycling team from the United States, announced to participate in the race. They said they want to show "how cycling can connect people".

The 32nd edition of the tour rescheduled from May to October to avoid coincidence with Iran's presidential election. The authority of the tour announced that the schedule of the following years will be on May as usual.

In 2020 and 2021 the race was not disputed.

Past winners

Multiple winners

References

External links

 
 
 Statistics at the-sports.org
 Azerbaïjan Tour at cqranking.com
 video of 2010 tour

 
Cycle races in Iran
UCI Asia Tour races
Recurring sporting events established in 1986
1986 establishments in Iran
Azerbaijan (Iran)
Tour of Azerbaijan (Iran) winners
Sport in Tabriz
Spring (season) events in Iran